The 1905–06 international cricket season was from September 1905 to April 1906. The season consists with a single international tour.

Season overview

January

England in South Africa

References

International cricket competitions by season
1905 in cricket
1906 in cricket